Kiccha is a 2003 Kannada political drama action film directed by P. A. Arun Prasad featuring Sudeep and Shwetha in the lead roles. It  features background score and soundtrack composed by Hamsalekha and lyrics by Hamsalekha. The film released on 11 April 2003.

Cast

 Sudeep as  Kiccha alias Krishna
 Shwetha as Suma
 Sujatha as Sharada, Kiccha's mother
 Ajay Rao as Kiccha's friend
 Sadhu Kokila  CD Babu
 Kashi 
 Avinash as Chief Minister
 Vinayak Joshi as Kiccha's friend
 Mico Manju as Kumar
 Karibasavaiah 
 Vaijanath Biradar as hostel watchman
 Mandya Ramesh as Umapathi
 M.S. Karanth as Home Minister
 Ravi Srivatsa 
 Bhavyashree Rai 
 Anandaraj as Minister
Ponnambalam

Soundtrack
Hamsalekha composed and penned the music. The music was released by Akash Audio.

Awards
Filmfare Awards South :-
 Best Director - Kannada - P.A. Arun Prasad

References

External links
 

2003 films
2000s Kannada-language films
Films scored by Hamsalekha
Indian political films
Films directed by P. A. Arun Prasad